Dominik Martinović (born 25 March 1997) is a German professional footballer who plays as a forward for Waldhof Mannheim.

References

External links
 
 

1997 births
Living people
Footballers from Stuttgart
German people of Croatian descent
Association football forwards
German footballers
Germany youth international footballers
Croatian footballers
Croatia youth international footballers
RB Leipzig II players
SV Wehen Wiesbaden players
SG Sonnenhof Großaspach players
SV Waldhof Mannheim players
3. Liga players
Regionalliga players